Cheposh (Çopoş) is a rural locality (a selo) and the administrative centre of Cheposhskoye Rural Settlement of Chemalsky District, the Altai Republic, Russia. The population was 739 as of 2016. There are 9 streets.

Geography 
Cheposh is located in the valley of the Katun River, 28 km northwest of Chemal (the district's administrative centre) by road. Turbaza "Katun" is the nearest rural locality.

References 

Rural localities in Chemalsky District